Compton  may refer to:

Places

Canada
 Compton (electoral district), a former Quebec federal electoral district
 Compton (provincial electoral district), a former Quebec provincial electoral district now part of Mégantic-Compton
 Compton, Quebec
 Compton County, Quebec
 Compton Creek, a tributary of the Adam River on Vancouver Island, British Columbia
 Compton Island, in the Queen Charlotte Strait region of British Columbia
 Compton Névé, a névé (icefield) in the Pacific Ranges, British Columbia
 Compton Glacier, a glacier in the Compton Névé, Pacific Ranges, British Columbia
 Compton Mountain, a mountain in the Compton Névé, Pacific Ranges, British Columbia

England
 Compton, Berkshire
 Compton, Derbyshire, a location
 Compton, Plymouth, Devon
 Compton, South Hams, a location
 Compton, Test Valley, a location
 Compton, Hampshire, in Winchester district
 Compton, Staffordshire, a location
 Compton, Guildford, Surrey
 Compton, Waverley, Surrey (near Farnham)
 Compton, West Sussex
 Compton, West Yorkshire, a former village
 Compton, Wiltshire
 Compton, Wolverhampton, West Midlands

United States
 Compton, Arkansas, an unincorporated community
 Compton, California, a city south-southeast of downtown Los Angeles
 Compton, Illinois, a village
 Compton, Maryland, an unincorporated community
Compton, Virginia, an unincorporated community
 Compton Township, Otter Tail County, Minnesota

Music
 Compton (album), a 2015 album by Dr. Dre
 "Compton", a song by Kendrick Lamar from Good Kid, M.A.A.D City
 "Compton", a song by The Game from Doctor's Advocate

Science and technology
 Compton (crater), a lunar crater
 Compton (software), an X composite manager; third-degree fork of Xcompmgr
 Compton Gamma Ray Observatory, a space observatory operational in Earth orbit from 1991 to 2000
 Compton Limestone, a geologic unit in Missouri
 Compton scattering, an effect observed when photons interact with electrons
 Compton wavelength, a quantum mechanical property of a particle

Other uses 
 Compton (surname), a surname (including a list of people with the name)
 Compton (Trappe, Maryland), a home
 Compton Petroleum, a petroleum exploration company based in Canada

See also